William I ( 1137 – 11 October 1159), also referred to as William of Blois, was Count of Boulogne and Earl of Surrey jure uxoris from 1153 until his death. He was the second son of Stephen, King of England, and Matilda I, Countess of Boulogne.

William married Isabel de Warenne, 4th Countess of Surrey, in 1148. In 1153, Stephen agreed to pass over William's elder brother Eustace IV of Boulogne as heir to the throne, conceding the succession to Henry Plantagenet, son of his cousin and rival Empress Matilda. Eustace died shortly afterwards and when his father signed the Treaty of Wallingford, William received the lands intended for both brothers, making him immensely rich. The treaty ended the Anarchy, a succession struggle between Stephen and Matilda of which both sides were growing weary.

Stephen died in 1154, and Henry initially allowed William to retain the earldom of Surrey jure uxoris (in right of his wife). However, Gervase of Canterbury asserts a plot against Henry's life was discovered in 1154 among some Flemish mercenaries. The plan was to assassinate Henry in Canterbury, and allegedly William had knowledge of this plot or was in connivance with the mercenaries. Whatever the truth, Henry fled Canterbury and returned to Normandy.

William had no children. He died in 1159 of disease near Toulouse, and was buried at the Poitevin abbey of Montmorel. He was succeeded in his county by his sister Marie I. His widow remarried to Henry's half-brother Hamelin.

References

Sources
 R. H. C. Davis (1967), King Stephen
 Thomas K. Keefe, "William, earl of Surrey (c. 1135–1159)", Oxford Dictionary of National Biography, 2004

1130s births
1159 deaths
Year of birth uncertain
12th-century English nobility
1041
Counts of Boulogne
Counts of Mortain
House of Blois
Children of Stephen, King of England
Anglo-Normans
Heirs apparent who never acceded
Sons of kings